Hoffman Athletic F.C. may refer to either of two association football clubs operated by the Hoffman Manufacturing Company during the 20th century:

 Hoffman Athletic F.C. (Chelmsford)
 Hoffman Athletic F.C. (Stonehouse)